Chas Fagan is an American artist and sculptor. He is known for painting oil portraits of all 45 U.S. Presidents (as of 2016), on commission from C-SPAN and the White House Historical Association. He also painted the official canonization image of Mother Teresa on commission from the Knights of Columbus, basing his work on a photograph by Michael Collopy. His other works include portraits, landscapes and still life, along with sculptures related to American historical figures. His work was featured in the American Presidents: Life Portraits exhibition in 1999, and in other venues.

Biography 
Chas Fagan was born in Ligonier, Pennsylvania in 1966. He spent much of his early life in Belgium with his father, who worked as a diplomat. He graduated Yale University with a degree in Russian and East European Studies. His earliest artistic works were political cartoons in a variety of publications. His career as a painter took off after his portrait of Ronald Reagan appeared on the cover of the conservative publication The Weekly Standard.

Fagan produced a monument of Captain James Jack and horse, who rode the Mecklenburg County, North Carolina, Declaration of Independence in June 1775 to the Continental Congress in Philadelphia. Dedication of the monument called "The Spirit of Mecklenburg" was made with full colonial set and re-enactors on the 235th anniversary of the famous ride and took place nationally on "Good Morning, America" hosted by Cokie Roberts.
His bronze sculpture of Reagan received criticism from KCRW journalist Edward Goldman for its:

Today he lives in Charlotte, North Carolina.

He was appointed to the Commission of Fine Arts by President Trump, and replaced by President Biden.

Works
 Ronald Reagan (2009), National Statuary Hall Collection, Washington, D.C.
 George H. W. Bush Monument (2004), Sesquicentennial Park, Houston, Texas

References

External links

1966 births
Living people
American male artists
Yale University alumni
People from Charlotte, North Carolina
People from Westmoreland County, Pennsylvania
Artists from Charlotte, North Carolina
The arts and politics